Joaquim Carvalho Cruz (born March 12, 1963) is a Brazilian former middle-distance runner, winner of the 800 meters at the 1984 Summer Olympics.  He is one of only five men to run the 800 metres in less than 1 minute, 42 seconds.

Biography
Cruz was born in Taguatinga, Distrito Federal. The son of a steel worker, he began running as a 13-year-old, and showed great promise as a junior. At the age of 15 his personal best over 800 m stood at 1:51 min. After setting a junior world record of 1:44.3 min in 1981, he received a scholarship for the University of Oregon in 1983. The move immediately paid off, and Cruz won the National Collegiate Athletic Association (NCAA) championships over 800 m that same year. He also competed in the inaugural World Championships in 1983, winning the bronze.

The following year at the 1984 NCAA Track and Field Championships, Cruz became one of only a handful of people to win the 800/1500 m double (a feat that would not be repeated until Andrew Wheating achieved it in 2010).  Cruz is the co-holder of University of Oregon 1,500 m school record of 3:36.48 along with A.J. Acosta. Later that summer, he ran a time of 2:14.09 min over 1000 m in Nice which is still the current South American record over that distance.

The 1984 Olympic Games were held in Los Angeles, and Cruz was considered to be one of the 800 m favorites, along with world record holder Sebastian Coe of Britain. In the last turn of the 800 meter final, Cruz started a sprint from second place and took the lead, never losing it. He crossed the line in 1:43.00, breaking Alberto Juantorena's Olympic Record and making him the first Brazilian Olympic track and field gold medalist since triple jumper Adhemar Ferreira da Silva won both in 1952 and 1956.

Later that week, after winning his first round heat of the Olympic 1500 m, Cruz did not start in the semi-finals due to a cold. After recovering from the cold, Cruz had a five-day stretch of racing a few weeks after the Olympic Games in which he set several extremely fast times.  First, he ran a new Brazilian 800 m record of 1:42.34 at the Weltklasse meet in Zurich, becoming only the second runner in history to break 1:43. Two days later he ran a 1:42.41 at the Memorial Van Damme meet in Brussels, and then two days after that, at a meeting in Cologne, Cruz ran the second fastest 800 meters in history at the time, his time of 1:41.77 being only four hundredths of a second outside of Coe's world record. He is the fifth fastest athlete in the history of the event.  By the end of the year, he was the NCAA champion, the Olympic champion, undefeated in all seven of his 800-meter finals, had run the 2nd, 4th, 5th, and 6th fastest 800 meter times in history, and easily ranked as #1 in the world for 800 meters in 1984 by Track & Field News magazine.

In 1985 Cruz won six of his eight 800 meter races, the last three of which were won under 1:43: 1:42.98 at ISTAF, 1:42.53 in Cologne (beating Sebastian Coe), and 1:42.49 in Koblenz. His record was good enough to earn him a World #1 ranking by Track & Field News magazine for the second year in a row. He also ran the world's 3rd fastest 1,000 meter time for 1985, a 2:15.11. In the following two years he struggled with injuries and raced little, though he did manage to win the gold medal in the 1,500 meters at the 1987 Pan American Games, defeating both Jim Spivey (who within the next month would win a bronze medal at the World Championships) and American mile record holder Steve Scott.

At the 1988 Summer Olympics, Cruz appeared to be on his way to retaining his Olympic 800 m title when he was passed by Kenyan runner Paul Ereng, leaving Cruz with the silver medal. Troubled by Achilles' tendon injuries, Cruz was never again able to reach the international top level. In 1993, he tried to make a comeback and started over 1500 m at various Grand Prix races in Europe but failed to make a major impact.  His last victory of significance came in the 1500 meters at the 1995 Pan American Games. One year later, taking part at his third Olympics at the 1996 Summer Olympics, Cruz was the Brazilian flag-bearer and ran the 1500 meters without reaching the finals.

Cruz competed at the 2001 Masters West Region Track and Field Championship winning the 5000 meter run at age 38.

Cruz was a torchbearer and lit the flame cauldron at the 2007 Pan American Games in Rio de Janeiro, on July 13, 2007. After retiring from competitions he became a running coach at the Olympic Training Center in Chula Vista, California. He guides David Brown and Shaquille Vance, among others.

References

External links

 Official site  
 

1963 births
Living people
Brazilian male middle-distance runners
Athletes (track and field) at the 1984 Summer Olympics
Athletes (track and field) at the 1988 Summer Olympics
Athletes (track and field) at the 1996 Summer Olympics
Athletes (track and field) at the 1987 Pan American Games
Athletes (track and field) at the 1995 Pan American Games
Olympic athletes of Brazil
Olympic gold medalists for Brazil
Olympic silver medalists for Brazil
Oregon Ducks men's track and field athletes
Pan American Games medalists in athletics (track and field)
World Athletics Championships medalists
Medalists at the 1988 Summer Olympics
Medalists at the 1984 Summer Olympics
Pan American Games gold medalists for Brazil
Olympic gold medalists in athletics (track and field)
Olympic silver medalists in athletics (track and field)
Medalists at the 1987 Pan American Games
Medalists at the 1995 Pan American Games
Sportspeople from Federal District (Brazil)
20th-century Brazilian people
Brazilian masters athletes